Medley relay  may refer to:

Swimming
Medley swimming, mixed distance relay events

Track and field
Distance medley relay
Sprint medley relay
Swedish medley relay